Shenzhen Technology University (SZTU) is a public university located in Pingshan District, Shenzhen, Guangdong, China.

Its first phase is scheduled to be  in area.

References

Universities and colleges in Shenzhen